Nawab Mohammad Moazam Khan (born 10 September 1970) is an Indian politician and a Member of Telangana Legislative Assembly of the Bahadurpura from the All India Majlis-e-Ittehadul Muslimeen.

Career 
In September 2004, the All India Majlis-e-Ittehadul Muslimeen party nominated Khan as their candidate for the Asif Nagar by elections instead of renominating Haji Seth. Party president Sultan Salahuddin Owaisi justified the nomination by saying that Khan came from  non-controversial and educated family. He won the elections by a margin of 2,110 votes as he was polled 25,719 votes compared to 24,609 votes in favour of Congress candidate Nagender. In 2009, he won the elections from the Bahadurpura. He was renominated by his party for the newly formed state Telangana assembly elections from Bahadurpura for 2nd time in 2014 where he had secured highest votes . He was re-elected from the constituency as he was polled 106,874 and hence defeating his nearest rival Telugu Desam Party's Mohammad Abdul Rahman by around 95,000 votes.

In 2018 Assembly Elections with his previous election performance he was renominated by the Party from the same Bahadurpura Constituency and won with the margin above 90,000 votes. With all this victorious performances he was called as back bone of AIMIM party as he secured highest votes time and time without any controversies and bad remark on him. He also served as member of Telangana Waqf board from 2014-2018 . He is also a panel speaker in Telangana legislative assembly(2018-2023)

References

External links
 

1970 births
All India Majlis-e-Ittehadul Muslimeen politicians
Living people
Telangana politicians
21st-century Indian politicians
Politicians from Hyderabad, India
Andhra Pradesh MLAs 2004–2009
Andhra Pradesh MLAs 2009–2014
Telangana MLAs 2014–2018
Telangana MLAs 2018–2023